SFU Exchange is a bus terminus for TransLink located on the campus of Simon Fraser University in Burnaby, British Columbia. It opened on September 3, 1965, and consists of 2 exchanges: the main exchange located at University Drive at East Campus Road at the eastern part of the campus and the secondary, and original, exchange located at the Transportation Centre. The exchanges primarily serve students, staff, and faculty of Simon Fraser University, as well as residents of UniverCity.

Routes
The following routes terminate at SFU Exchange.

Main exchange: 

Transportation Centre exchange:

References

TransLink (British Columbia) bus stations
Transport in Burnaby